The Association for Global New Thought (AGNT) is an organization of ministers, lay people, heads of other New Thought organizations, and people of all faiths dedicated to "conscious co-creation". Its New Thought member churches and centers number between 600 and 700, and include Unity churches, Religious Science, Divine Science centers, and nondenominational New Thought spiritual communities.

History 

The Association for Global New Thought was formed after, "a leadership struggle in 1996 resulted in a number of influential leaders leaving INTA (International New Thought Alliance) to form the Association for Global New Thought." Mary Morrissey was the Association's co-founder and its first president alongside Rev. Michael Beckwith.

Activities 

Programs of the AGNT include the Season for Nonviolence; the Synthesis Dialogues with His Holiness, the Dalai Lama; the Awaked World Annual Conference; and New Thought Broadcasting.

References

External links 
 Association for Global New Thought official website

New Thought organizations
Religious organizations established in 1996
Organizations based in California